USS Success is a name used more than once by the United States Navy:

 USS Success (1776) a gondola built in 1776 at Skenesboro, New York, for service in General Benedict Arnold's fleet on Lake Champlain. However, since she is not mentioned in any of the operations of that squadron, she may have been renamed; but no record of the name change has been found.
  was laid down on 18 February 1944 by Associated Shipbuilders, Seattle, Washington.

United States Navy ship names